Wapello (1787 – March 15, 1842) was a Native American chief of the Meskwaki tribe.

Early life
Wapello was born in 1787 at Prairie du Chien, Northwest Territory. Short and stout in physical stature, with a kindly visage, Wapello entertained friendly relations with white settlers throughout his life.  Under pressure to cede territory to the United States, he signed peace treaties with them at Fort Armstrong at Rock Island, Illinois, on September 3, 1822; at Prairie du Chien on July 15, 1830; at Fort Armstrong on September 21, 1832; at Dubuque, Iowa, on September 28, 1836; and at Washington, D.C., on October 21, 1837. During the Black Hawk War, Wapello supported chief Keokuk. In the 1840s, many Fox were forced west to Kansas.

Settling in Iowa
 In 1829, he led his tribe to Muscatine Slough on the west bank of the Mississippi River and later settled in Iowa. The frontier town of Wapello later developed near here. In 1837, he accompanied the renowned chief Keokuk and United States Indian agent General Joseph M. Street on a tour of northeastern and mid-Atlantic states. During this trip, Wapello made an eloquent speech at Boston, Massachusetts, wherein he expressed friendly sentiments towards white settlers and reaffirmed his desire to continue harmonious relations with them.

Death and legacy
While on a hunting trip near the Skunk River east of Ottumwa, Iowa, Wapello died on March 15, 1842. He was later buried in accordance with his oft-expressed wish that he be laid to rest alongside his good friend General Street, at the site of the government agency in what is now a small park named Chief Wapello's Memorial Park located southeast of Agency, Iowa.

Chief Wapello's portrait was painted by Charles Bird King and a lithograph included with the chief's biography in Thomas McKenney and James Hall's History of the Indian Tribes of North America (1836–1844, three volumes).
Chief Wapello is currently the official corporate identity of Mid-Continent Airlines.
In Iowa, the city of Wapello and Wapello County are named for him. West of Drakesville, in Davis County, rests Lake Wapello, the enclosing Lake Wapello State Park, and the adjacent former Boy Scout Camp Wapello.
An annual event called Chief Wapello Days is held in Wapello, Iowa.
In Illinois, the town of Hanover, was once named for Wapello and contains the Jo Daviess Conservation Foundation's Wapello Land and Water Reserve.
The USS Wapello (YN-56), a United States Navy net tender in commission from 1941 to 1946, was named for him.
A large,  statue of Chief Wapello was installed in his honor atop the Wapello County Courthouse in Ottumwa, Iowa since the building was constructed in 1894. The statue and its mounting base received severe damage during a thunderstorm in June 2012, causing it to fall. After repair, restoration, and upgrade of the base with stainless steel, the statue was returned to the rooftop on March 13, 2014.

See also
Mid-Continent Airlines

References

External links
 (Ship namesake paragraph)

1787 births
1842 deaths
Native American leaders
Native Americans of the Black Hawk War
People from Wapello County, Iowa
People from Prairie du Chien, Wisconsin
People of the Northwest Territory
18th-century Native Americans